Skeleton Technologies is a Global Cleantech 100 company and an energy storage developer and manufacturer for transportation, grid, automotive, and industrial applications. Skeleton uses a patented raw material, curved graphene, to produce solutions for the energy storage market, including high-power supercapacitors and high-energy solid-state batteries.

About 
Skeleton was established in 2009 by Oliver Ahlberg, Taavi Madiberk, Dr. Jaan Leis, and Dr. Anti Perkson when they began developing graphene-based supercapacitors. The company now has over 300 employees throughout its various locations. Skeleton operates in Germany and Estonia, with headquarters, IT and module development in Tallinn. In Germany, the company operates a materials development facility for curved graphene in Bitterfeld-Wolfen, as well as a supercapacitor factory in Großröhrsdorf. Skeleton is also building an additional supercapacitor factory near Leipzig in partnership with Siemens, which is estimated to become the world's largest supercapacitor production site.
 
Currently, Skeleton is a supplier to a number of global OEMs in automotive, transportation, grid, and further industrial applications such as Siemens, Škoda, and Hitachi. They are also a member of the European Battery Alliance, an industry group with over 750 members focused on developing a European battery value chain. The company has received media attention in outlets such as Bloomberg News, The Economist, Sifted, and Financial Times for their German production, battery expertise, and development of novel technologies.

History

2009–2012: First production 
Skeleton Technologies was created in 2009 for the purpose of developing graphene-based supercapacitors. In 2011, the company started the development of SpaceCap, a capacitor based on Skeleton's proprietary Carbon Derived Carbon material, as a part of a commission from the European Space Agency. In 2012, Skeleton launched its first commercial product series.

2013–2016: First investor, manufacturing, and awards 
In 2013, Skeleton Technologies was incorporated in Germany for the first time as a GmbH, the German equivalent of a private limited company or limited liability company. That same year, the company received its first financing tranche of 2.2 million euros in Round A financing.

In 2014, the company opened and began operating out of its first manufacturing facility in Viimsi, Estonia. They also participated in the Norway Grants "Green ICT" program, a cooperation programme between Estonia and Norway intended to facilitate sustainable development and green technology innovation, using the grant money to continue the development of their ultracapacitor technologies.

At the Ecosummit 2015 in London, Skeleton Technologies was presented with the 'best startup' award as well as 1.5K EUR in prize money. Together with Adgero SARL, in 2015 they introduced a supercapacitor-based kinetic energy recovery system for trucks, designed to reduce fuel consumption.

2017–2019: Production scaling, portfolio expansion, and growth 
In 2017, Skeleton ISO 9001 and 14001 began to scale up production of its ISO 9001 and 14001 modules at its facility in Großröhrsdorf, Germany. At the tenth annual Bloomberg New Energy Finance Summit in New York City, the company was honoured as one of ten 2017 New Energy Pioneers.

Beginning in 2018, the company expanded its product portfolio and began receiving orders from firms in the automotive, logistics, and aerospace industries.

By 2019, Skeleton's revenue growth tripled, and the company received more than 100 million euros in order intake. After a stringent testing course, the company's SkelCap SCA series supercapacitor cells were given 810A certification from the safety organisation UL, certifying that the cells are safe for use in automotive applications and uninterruptible power supplies.

2020–2022: Continued investment and new factory 
Following a Series D financing round in 2020, Skeleton raised an additional 41.3 million euros.

In 2021, Skeleton Technologies was awarded the SET4FUTURE Innovation Award, honouring organisations that create innovative products and solutions for future railway technology and contribute to traffic reduction. The company also received IATF 16949 certification, an international quality standard for the automotive industry, that year.

In 2022, Skeleton announced the investment of 220 million euros to begin building a new factory near Leipzig, in partnership with Siemens. The factory will be located in Markranstädt and is Skeleton's second manufacturing site in the state of Saxony.

Industries and applications

Automotive 
Skeleton produces supercapacitors to improve fuel efficiency and support power storage and discharge in electric vehicles. In automotive applications, supercapacitors can be connected in parallel with batteries to increase both energy density and power density and improve the longevity of the energy storage system.

Grid 
Skeleton offers supercapacitor-based energy storage systems for wind power applications, which help control wind power plant output and provide ancillary services to the power system. As an energy storage medium, supercapacitors can deploy electricity instantaneously to manage demand surges and power quality issues such as flickers and interruption events. In heavy transport and grid applications, Skeleton works with the Italian electronics wholesaler DimacRed S.p.A. for distribution and technical cooperation.

Industrial 
Skeleton has developed solutions for cranes and elevators as well as technologies for the marine, medical, and oil & gas sectors. For Transiidikeskus, one of the largest container terminals in the Baltic Region, the company developed a crane equipped with a graphene supercapacitor-powered kinetic energy recovery system (KERS), reducing the fuel consumption and CO2 emissions by 34%. Skeleton has also developed a KERS system for elevators that is able to reduce energy consumption by 50% or more by storing and reusing energy generated during operation
 
In automated warehousing applications, Skeleton's supercapacitors are used for instantaneous charging of automated guided vehicles. The company has also worked with French aeronautic firm Flying Whales to build a 60-ton large capacity airship, or LCA60T, for the global transport market. The LCA60T is able to transport heavy and oversized cargo of up to 60 tons in its 75-meter hold or slung under the ship at speeds of 100 km/h, with a range of several thousand kilometers per day.

Transportation 
In addition to cars, Skeleton Technologies provides supercapacitor-based solutions for rail and trams, trucks, bus, and heavy equipment.

Skeleton Technologies and Class8 Energy, a Canadian equipment distributor, have signed an €11.6 million contract to supply supercapacitor modules to the North American trucking and retail industries. The modules will reduce cold-cranking time by a factor of 2 and offer higher cranking power than a battery, without toxic materials.
 
The company is a supplier for several tram producers in major European cities. Skeleton has a contract with Škoda Electric, a branch of the auto company which produces electric motors for rail applications, to provide supercapacitors for Mannheim's tram system. They also have a large-scale contract with Medcom, an electric traction producer, to provide supercapacitors for the Warsaw tram network. For Škoda and Medcom, the SkelMod 51V module has enabled energy savings of up to 30% with onboard kinetic energy recovery, an application where braking energy is harnessed by the supercapacitor module bank and used for acceleration.
 
Polish electrical switchgear manufacturer ZPUE and Skeleton Technologies have signed a letter of intent, stating that Skeleton will provide supercapacitors for rail wayside storage at 200 MW per year from 2023 to 2025. These storage systems, located inside the station rather than in the train itself, capture energy released as the train brakes and use it to power acceleration. Skeleton will also supply 160 MW of storage for grid stability applications between 2023 and 2025. The cooperation represents more than 30 million euros of commercial value. As with tram applications, Skeleton's technologies have been shown to improve train efficiency by increasing energy savings to reduce costs and CO2 emissions. The implementation of supercapacitor technology provides effective voltage stabilization for rail systems, improves propulsion performance for light rail vehicles, and advances locomotive engine starting technologies.

Technology 
Skeleton’s SkelCap supercapacitor series provides up to four times higher power density as well as lower equivalent series resistance when compared to other supercapacitor cells, leading to improved application lifetime. They have a long lifetime of over 1 million charge cycles or 15+ years and near-total efficiency in temperatures ranging from -40 to 65 degrees Celsius.

Financing 
Skeleton Technologies has secured funding from a variety of sources in their 13-year history, including:

 €2.5 million from the European Innovation Council to double the capacity of their graphene supercapacitors as part of the SKLCARBONP2 project.
 €4 million in investments from KIC InnoEnergy, an investment company dedicated to promoting sustainable innovation and entrepreneurship in Europe’s energy industry.
 €15 million in ‘quasi-equity’ financing from the European Investment Bank.
 €13 million in new investment from FirstFloor Capital, a Malaysian venture capital investment firm specialising in funding high-growth technology companies. This investment brought Skeleton's total financing to €26.7 million in Round C.
 €51 million from Germany’s Federal Ministry for Economic Affairs and Climate Action (BMWi) and the Free State of Saxony to execute their development roadmap as part of the European Battery Innovation IPCEI.
 €70.4 million in total Round D financing.

In total, Skeleton Technologies have received over 200 million euros in financing. Additional investors include Marubeni, Harju Elekter, Up Invest, MM Grupp, CTEK, and Wise.

Philanthropy 
Skeleton Technologies CEO and co-founder Taavi Madiberk initiated discussions to establish a €20 million support fund from the European Innovation Council for Ukrainian deep tech startups after the 2022 Russian invasion of Ukraine. At a press conference in Brussels, Commissioner for Innovation and Research Mariya Gabriel announced her support for the fund, which targets innovative tech companies that are established in Ukraine as well as companies that have relocated to EU member states or Horizon Europe-associated countries following the start of the war. The proposal focuses on strengthening the Ukrainian tech ecosystem and supporting innovative solutions for rebuilding.

References

Battery manufacturers
Manufacturing companies of Estonia